Ferdinand Charles Carl "Fernie" Flaman (January 25, 1927 – June 22, 2012) was a Canadian professional ice hockey defenceman who played for the Boston Bruins and Toronto Maple Leafs in the National Hockey League. He was known as a physical defensive defenceman and a consummate bodychecker. As a coach, Flaman was successful at the collegiate ranks as the head coach of Northeastern University.

Career
After being signed by the Bruins in 1943 and playing three seasons for the minor-league Boston Olympics (during which time he was named to the Eastern Hockey League's First All-Star Team in 1945 and 1946), Flaman made the big club for good in the 1947 season.  He played five seasons for Boston before being traded to the Toronto Maple Leafs, with whom he won a Stanley Cup the year he was dealt in 1951.

He played three more seasons for Toronto before being dealt back to the Bruins in 1954 (in which he led the league in penalty minutes with 150), for whom he played seven more seasons.  Those were his peak years, as he was named Bruins' captain in 1955 (and served as such for the rest of his NHL career), was named to three NHL Second All-Star Teams (1955, 1957 and 1958), and played in five All-Star Games.

In 1961, Flaman was named the player-coach-general manager of the AHL Providence Reds, retiring as an active player after the 1963–1964 season.  He coached Providence for one more year after that, coaching teams in the Western Hockey League and the Central Hockey League thereafter.  In 1970, Flaman was named the head coach of the Northeastern University Huskies men's college team, and coached for nineteen seasons (the longest tenure in school history), amassing a 256–301–24 record.  He was named United States college coach of the year in 1982, and led the Huskies to four Beanpot Tournament championships and a Hockey East championship in 1988. He retired from Northeastern the next year.  He carried out the remainder of his career serving as a scout for the Devils.

Flaman finished his NHL career with 34 goals and 174 assists for 208 points in 910 games, and added 1370 penalty minutes.  At the time of his retirement, he was third in NHL history in career penalty minutes.

Flaman was inducted into the Rhode Island Hockey Hall of Fame in 1965, the Northeastern Hall of Fame in 1989, the Hockey Hall of Fame in 1990, the Saskatchewan Sports Hall of Fame in 1992, and the Ted Knight Saskatchewan Hockey Hall of Fame in 2019. He died in 2012.

Career statistics

* Stanley Cup Champion.

Head coaching record

Source:

See also
Captain (ice hockey)

References

External links

1927 births
2012 deaths
Boston Bruins captains
Boston Bruins players
Boston Bruins scouts
Boston Olympics players
Canadian ice hockey defencemen
Hershey Bears players
Hockey Hall of Fame inductees
Ice hockey people from Saskatchewan
New Jersey Devils scouts
Northeastern Huskies men's ice hockey coaches
Pittsburgh Hornets players
Providence Reds players
Stanley Cup champions
Toronto Maple Leafs players